Desa Cattle (Sabah) Sdn Bhd (doing business as Desa Cattle) is the main dairy product company in the state of Sabah, Malaysia since 1980. Owned by Desa Cattle (Sabah) Sdn Bhd, it is the main dairy product producer in Borneo. The company feature a 199-hectare cattle dairy farm at Mesilau in Kundasang, with an estimate 150,000 litres fresh milk produced each month, as well a cattle feedlot for meat production in Lok Kawi and Penampang. Young cattle from the farm are fed with specially formulated feed to average 420 kg weight before being slaughtered at Meat Technology Centre.

History 
Dairy and cattle-farming began in Sabah in the 1980s with the company developed by Harris Salleh under state government-linked company to see the state to develop its own self-produced dairy products and meat. The state government also establish a cattle farm in Darwin, Australia and the state finally reached its target in 1998 to become 100% self-sufficiency in the production of meats. The farm was owned by Desa Cattle Sdn Bhd, a subsidiary of Village Development Corporation (KPD). After several years operating, Harris together with Lajim Ukin decided to sell the farm in Australia; along with the remaining thousands of acres of farm in Sabah although Lajim denied his involvement in the selling. The company was then privatised in 1994. Its headquarters in Kota Kinabalu was established in 2010, although based on a news release in 2011, the company has been under the state government.

Notes

References

External links 
 
 Desa Cattle (Sabah) Sdn Bhd Company Profile on Bloomberg L.P.

1980 establishments in Malaysia
Dairy products companies of Malaysia
Holding companies of Malaysia
Government-owned companies of Malaysia
Malaysian brands
Manufacturing companies established in 1980
Privately held companies of Malaysia
Food and drink companies established in 1980
Malaysian companies established in 1980